This is a list of notable events in the history of LGBT rights that took place in the year 1983.

Events

February
 In the 1983 by-election for the Bermondsey constituency in South London, Labour candidate Peter Tatchell loses a previously safe seat after a campaign dominated by attacks on his left-wing politics and homosexuality.

October 
 3 – In the United States, the AFL–CIO labor union votes to support gay rights legislation.

November
 New York governor Mario Cuomo issues an executive order banning public sexual orientation discrimination.

December 
 30 – Ohio governor Richard Celeste issues Executive Order 83-64, which prohibits discrimination in state employment on the basis of sexual orientation.

See also

Timeline of LGBT history – timeline of events from 12,000 BCE to present
LGBT rights by country or territory – current legal status around the world
LGBT social movements

References

LGBT rights by year
1983 in LGBT history